Béatrix Saule (b. 10 November 1950), née Houdart de La Motte, is a French art historian. She spent much of her career at the Palace of Versailles, for which she began working in 1976, and served as director of the Public Establishment of the Palace, Museum and National Estate of Versailles from 2010 to 2016.

Early life
Béatrix Saule was born on 10 November 1950 in Charenton-le-Pont, near Paris.

Education
Saule was admitted to the French Academy in Rome in 1975, where she was a resident until 1976.

Career at Versailles
Saule began her career at the Palace of Versailles in 1976, and by 1988 was its chief curator. When the Public Establishment of the Palace, Museum and National Estate of Versailles was established in 1995, Saule was made the director of its outreach program.

Director-General of the Public Establishment
Saule was appointed the director of the Palace of Versailles Research Centre in 2008. She was a vocal opponent of the display of contemporary art within the palace of Versailles, but supported its display in the gardens.

On 4 December 2010, Frédéric Mitterrand, then the French Minister of Culture, appointed Saule as director-general of the Public Establishment of the Palace, Museum and National Estate of Versailles, established in 1995.

As her final act as director-general, Saule helped organize an exhibition of 130 items from Versailles and select Australian collections at the National Gallery of Australia in late 2016 and early 2017. She was succeeded by curator Laurent Salomé.

Post-Versailles
Saule was a curator of an exhibit of over 150 items from Notre Dame de Paris in 2020, many of which were recovered from the cathedral immediately after the 2015 fire.

Citations

Living people
1950 births
French curators
French art historians
Chevaliers of the Légion d'honneur
Knights of the Ordre national du Mérite
Officiers of the Ordre des Arts et des Lettres
Knights of the Order of the Dannebrog
People from Charenton-le-Pont
French women curators